Child protection is the safeguarding of children from violence, exploitation, abuse, and neglect. Article 19 of the UN Convention on the Rights of the Child provides for the protection of children in and out of the home. One of the ways to ensure this is by giving them quality education, the fourth of the United Nations Sustainable Development Goals, in addition to other child protection systems. To protect a child has to start from conception, even how the conception took place can affect the child's development. For proper child development to take place child protection must be put into consideration.

Child protection can also be said to be the process of protecting children from abuse, neglect, exploitation, and other forms of harm. It involves identifying signs of potential harm, responding to allegations or suspicions of abuse, providing support and services to protect children, and holding those who have harmed them accountable.

The primary goal of child protection is to ensure that all children are safe and free from harm. This includes physical, emotional, and sexual abuse; neglect; exploitation; and violence. Child protection also works to prevent future harm by creating policies and systems that identify and respond to risks before they lead to harm.

In order to achieve these goals, child protection services must be provided in a holistic way. This means taking into account the social, economic, cultural, psychological, and environmental factors that can contribute to the risk of harm for individual children and their families. It also requires collaboration across sectors and disciplines to create a comprehensive system of support and safety for children.

Child protection is the protection of children from violence, exploitation, abuse and neglect. It is the responsibility of individuals, organizations and governments to ensure that children are protected from harm and their rights are respected. This includes providing a safe environment for children to grow and develop, protecting them from physical, emotional and sexual abuse, and ensuring they have access to education, healthcare and other basic needs.

Child protection systems are a set of usually government-run services designed to protect children and young people who are underage and to encourage family stability. UNICEF defines a 'child protection system' as:

Encountered problems

Child labour
Child labour is the practice of having children engage in economic activity, on a part- or full-time basis. The practice deprives children of their childhood, and is harmful to their physical and mental development. It is considered to be a form of exploitation and is illegal in many countries.

Due to economic reasons, especially in poor countries, children are forced to work in order to survive. Child labour often happens in difficult conditions, which are dangerous and impair the education of the future citizens and increase vulnerability to adults. It is hard to know exactly the age and number of children  who work. At least 152 million children under 5 years of age worked in 2016, but the figure is underestimated because domestic labour is not counted.

Endangerment and infanticide
Endangerment is the act of putting a species at risk of extinction due to human activities such as hunting, habitat destruction, and pollution. Infanticide is the intentional killing of an infant or newborn. Additionally, it refers to placing a person or animal in danger or at risk of death, injury, or loss. It can occur when someone deliberately puts another person or animal in danger, either directly or indirectly. Examples of endangerment include leaving a child unattended in a car with the windows rolled up, allowing an animal to roam freely without proper protection from the elements, and providing inadequate shelter for a pet.

Infanticide is the intentional killing of infants and young children. This practice has been documented throughout history and is still occurring in certain cultures today, usually as a result of poverty or other social pressures. Infanticide can be carried out by parents, relatives, or strangers and is often seen as a form of gender-based violence, since female babies are more likely to be killed than male ones. In some cases, infanticide may also be used to conceal evidence of incest or rape. It is most commonly practiced in cultures where there is a preference for male children, or where resources are scarce.

In some countries, children can be imprisoned for common crimes. In some countries, like Iran or China, criminals can even be sentenced to capital punishment for crimes committed while they were children (the United States abandoned the practice in 2005). In contexts where military use of children is made, they also risk becoming prisoners of war. Other children are forced into prostitution, exploited by adults for illegal traffic in children, or endangered by poverty and hunger. Infanticide today continues at a much higher rate in areas of extremely high poverty and overpopulation, such as parts of China and India. Female infants, then and even now, are particularly vulnerable, which is a factor in sex-selective infanticide.

Child abuse

Most children who come to the attention of the child welfare system do so, because of any of the following situations, which are often collectively termed child abuse. Abuse typically involves abuse of power, or exercising power for an unintended purpose. This includes willful neglect, knowingly not exercising a power for the purpose it was intended. This is why child abuse is defined as taking advantage of a position of trust having been invested with powers
 Physical abuse, is physical assault or battery on the child. Whilst an assault has some adverse consequence that the victim did not agree to (the difference between surgery and stabbing) the victim agrees to the consequences of battery but the agreement is fraudulent in some way (e.g. unnecessary surgery under false pretences). Physical abuse also harassment, a physical presence intended to provoke fear.
 Child sexual abuse, is sexual assault or battery on the child. The vast majority of physical assaults are a reaction to a situation involving a specific victim. Sexual assault is predominantly perpetrator gratification against any suitable target. Sexual abuse covers the range of direct and indirect assaults (e.g. imagery) and the means of facilitation such as stalking and internet offences.
 Neglect, including failure to take adequate measures to safeguard a child from harm, and gross negligence in providing for a child's basic needs. Needs are the actions to be taken to protect and provide for the child. Safeguarding is the duty of a person given the powers of responsibility for the child to take the necessary measures to protect the child. If a child is physically or sexually abused then there is an (abusive) person responsible for the assault and a (negligent) person responsible for failing to protect from the assault. In some cases they may be the same. 
 Psychological abuse, when meeting the child's needs by taking the necessary steps to protect and provide for the child the child's wishes and feelings must be considered when deciding on delivery of the provision that best serves the child's needs. Willfully failing to provide in accordance with the child's wishes and feelings, whilst it is in his/her best interests is emotional abuse (intentional infliction of emotional distress) or negligently is emotional neglect (negligent infliction of emotional distress).

Parental responsibility
Parental responsibility is the legal obligation of a parent to provide for their child's physical, emotional, and financial needs. This includes providing food, shelter, clothing, education, medical care, and emotional support. It also includes protecting the child from harm and ensuring their safety. In 1984 the Council of Europe, the body that supervises the European Convention on Human Rights, make Recommendation R(84) 4 on Parental Responsibilities. These defined parental responsibility as a 'function' duties to be met and powers that can be exercised to meet those duties. Child abuse and neglect is failure by a person with parental or any other protective responsibility to exercise the powers for the intended purpose, which is the benefit of the child.

Actions typically include services aimed at supporting at-risk families so they can remain intact to safeguard and promote the welfare of the child, investigation of alleged child abuse and, if necessary, assuming parental responsibility by foster care and adoption services.

Child maltreatment

Services are provided by corporate bodies (or legal personalities). Parental responsibility gives parents and businesses that make provision to children and families equivalent legal entities. This includes public bodies and public bodies that regulate private bodies. This has been described as the partnership between state and family.

A position held in a body corporate places a person in a position of trust. Child maltreatment is the neglectful or abusive exercise of power in a position of trust by either business in delivery of the products that best serve the child's needs for the parents to provide for the child or by the parents in providing for the child with those products.

Other

A 2014 European Commission survey on child protection systems listed the following categories of children needing help:
 Child victims of sexual abuse/exploitation
 Child victims of neglect or abuse
 Child victims of trafficking
 Children with disabilities
 Children in a situation of migration
 Unaccompanied children in a situation of migration
 Children without parental care/in alternative care
 Children in police custody or detention
 Street children
 Children of parents in prison or custody
 Children in judicial proceedings
 Children in or at risk of poverty
 Missing children (e.g. runaways, abducted children, unaccompanied children going missing)
 Children affected by custody disputes, including parental child abduction
 Children left behind (by parents who move to another EU country for work)
 Children belonging to minority ethnic groups, e.g. Roma
 Child victims of female genital mutilation or forced marriage
 Children who are not in compulsory education or training or working children below the legal age for work
 Child victims of bullying or cyberbullying

International treaties
The International Labour Organization (ILO) is a United Nations agency dealing with labour issues, created in 1919. It takes care also of child labour issues, in particular with conventions 138 and 182.

On 20 November 1959 the United Nations General Assembly adopted a Declaration of the Rights of the Child during the Convention on the Rights of the Child.

The United Nations Children's Fund (UNICEF) is a United Nations Programme headquartered in New York City, that provides long-term humanitarian and developmental assistance to children and mothers in developing countries.

In 2000, an agreement was reached among UNO countries about the military use of children.

The effectiveness of these programs is contested and seems limited to some.

History

Provincial or state governments' child protection legislation empowers the government department or agency to provide services in the area and to intervene in families where child abuse or other problems are suspected. The agency that manages these services has various names in different provinces and states, e.g., Department of Children's Services, Children's Aid, Department of Child and Family Services. There is some consistency in the nature of laws, though the application of the laws varies across the country.

The United Nations has addressed child abuse as a human rights issue, adding a section specifically to children in the Universal Declaration of Human Rights:

Child protection 
Most countries have introduced laws to protect, prevent children and young persons from certain threats or harms.

United Kingdom
The United Kingdom, similar to many countries around the world, operates a wide variety of systems and safeguards to protect children from harm and abuse.  To protect children from harm outside of their home life, the government use a wide variety of policy, regulations, guidance and best practice. This includes, but is not limited to:

 The regulation of products or services by age restriction such as, gambling, tobacco, alcohol, driving, movie certification, game certification etc. 
 Criminilising specific harm to children, or providing for harsher punishments within sentencing guidelines when a child is the victim. 
 Criminilising harm to children through exploitation, trafficking or modern slavery.
 Prohibiting unfair employment practices and placing restrictions on child labour. 
putting in place measures and checks ensuring individuals convicted of crimes against children are not able to work in roles where children would be placed at risk such as Teachers, Police  Officers or Social Workers. 
 Mandating compulsory education for children over 5.

There are also safeguards and services in place to protect children from harm in other contexts including from within their home or directly from their family, carers or peers as children have the right to live free of abuse (Human Rights Act).

There is no central directorate or agency responsible for safeguarding children within the UK. Legislation places responsibility for supporting children and their families onto local councils and authorities including the City of London Corporation. This same legislation also places duties upon these organisations to assess children's safety, intervene where necessary or accommodate children who require it.

History
Throughout much of the 19th century there was minimal protection for the safely of children. The rights of parents to raise their children as they wished as well as the ability of adult authority figures to establish obedience in their charges through corporal punishment was given priority. As social reformer Whatley Cooke-Taylor wrote:

Attitudes were shifting by the 1880s, beginning in 1883, local societies focused on child welfare began to be established across the country which had developed by the end of the decade into the National Society for the Prevention of Cruelty to Children. The Children's Charter which came into law in 1889 gave the state the ability to intervene in the parent-child relationship in order to prevent mistreatment for the first time. The rights of children were again extended five years later.

In 1908, the Children Act 1908 was introduced followed by the Children and Young Person Act 1920 with a bundle of laws to protect young persons and children in the early 20th century. The Children and Young Persons Act 1933 consolidated the laws into a single law.

The Children Act 1933 defined child neglect and abuse as is now currently understood in the context of welfare and well-being. Welfare (health, safety and happiness) is the fare, nourishment, that makes a person well, healthy.

The 1933 Act also made several key changes in relation to children at the time such as, but not limited to:

 Minimum age of execution was raised from 16 to 18 years.
 The age of criminal responsibility was raised from 7 to 8 years.
 Introduction of a minimum working age of 14 years.
 The minimum age to smoke and to buy tobacco products was set at 16 years.
 The minimum age for prostitution and to enter a brothel is set at 16 years.
 The minimum age to give alcohol to a child on a private premises is set at 5 years.

One commentator notes that 'the period before 1948 saw the majority of work with vulnerable children undertaken by 'moral' or family welfare workers. These were mostly voluntary workers based within groups such as the Church of England's Moral Welfare Associations. Their remit also included supporting friendless girls, unmarried mothers and babies, intervening to prevent prostitution, and helping treat and prevent the spread of venereal disease. Boys were not widely perceived as sexually vulnerable, and barely featured in discussions of child assault and prostitution.'

Whilst the Children and Young People Act 1933 established the foundations, they were later consolidated by the Children Act 1989 and following volume of legislation. Internationally, the principles were embodied in the UN Convention on the Rights of the Child.

Early help
"Early Help", or "early intervention", is the term used to describe arrangements and services which respond to the needs of children, young people and their families as soon as problems start to emerge at any point in their lives, or when there is a strong likelihood that problems will emerge in the future. Statutory guidance highlights the importance of offering early intervention services, rather than waiting until a child or family's situation escalates.

Current legislation

Child welfare

The laws of negligence and contract

As can be seen from the above provisions, which all follow the principles of the Children and Young Peoples Act 1933, child protection is concerned with the child's exposure to, and consumption of, potentially hazardous products of all description.

The act followed Donoghue v Stevenson [1932] UKHL 100 to reflect the new law of negligence and demolition of the privily barrier in the law of contract. The new law recognized that the product manufacturer may be many parties removed from the ultimate product consumer and that the product may contain potentially hazardous but un-examinable content. This may be either through ingredient or packaging. Food intolerances are a simple example. The purchaser will be unaware of potentiality allergic content unless clearly advised by the producer.

The purchaser, or more generally 'procurer' (person who obtains), of product may not be the ultimate consumer. A parent procures for a child who is, potentially, the most vulnerable consumer. Section 1(1) of the Children and Young Peoples Act 1933 makes it a criminal offence of child cruelty for the person responsible for a child to expose him/her "in a manner likely to cause him unnecessary suffering or injury to health" (emphasis supplied). The approach is no different to employment health and safety, but for the consumer rather than the employee.

It is the "manner" of acting that is important: is this activity being carried out safely after an appropriate risk assessment to meet the duty of care in the law of negligence established by Donoghue. The person responsible for a child should know the child's food allergies and check any product content for potential food intolerances before allowing the child to consume the product.

Safeguarding the welfare of the child

Child safeguarding follows directly from these principles. Safeguarding means taking the necessary protective measures for the child's safe consumption of any product, stair-gates, seatbelts, protective footwear, glasses, basic hygiene, etc. The list is both endless and, to the most part, obvious common sense. Failure by the responsible person is an offence of child cruelty on the grounds of failing to protect the child in circumstances consistent with the provision of safe and effective care.

A parent, person with parental responsibility for a child, has an express liability, whoever is responsible for the child at the time (s.17 of the act). Just as in employment health and safety, the powers of parenthood can be delegated but not the duties. Parents should make arrangements for suitable and properly informed others to have responsibility for their children (see also s.2(9)-(11) Children Act 1989).

Proper consent or agreement

For the product to be safely consumed by a child means that the responsible person must fully understand the product's safe use for its intended purpose. Miss-selling in the law of contract, suggesting the product does something it doesn't or selling products to those that do not fully understand what they are getting is potentially hazardous to the child as the ultimate consumer. Health and medical treatment may involve some form of physical contact in which case lack of proper consent is a potential battery, or even assault, of the person. The procurer must be placed in a position to assess any potential risk to the child in the reliable use of the product. (see 1.19 Reference Guide to Consent for Examination and Treatment (DOH 2009)).

Welfare, risk assessment and the calculus of negligence 

Just as in all of life, the likely benefits of a procured product come with possible non-beneficial qualities. Procurement is a careful activity attempting to achieve the best value for money. The benefits of the product must be satisfactorily delivered as specified for performance in the law of contract. Just as in food intolerances and consent to examination and treatment, the procurer must be made aware of any potential hazards in their circumstances of a product that performs reliably.

Welfare defines the process by which proper consent or agreement is given when procuring products that will be beneficial and safe in the procurer's particular circumstances. If a child is the ultimate consumer of a procured product then the child's welfare (health, safety and happiness) is the paramount consideration when coming to the decision (see s.1(1) Children Act 1989).

A balance must be struck between the obligations of the producer and the obligations of the procurer for the child's safe consumption of the product. The calculus of negligence is a legal approach, in the spirit of procurement efficiency, that attempts to strike that balance on economic grounds. This is most easily understood in terms of insurance liability. Should a car driver have a duty of care towards unlit cyclists at night or should the cyclist have a duty of care to properly illuminate his bicycle at night? The costs of driving with a duty of care to unlit cyclists is considerably less than the cost of bicycle illumination.

Promoting the welfare of the child and the CAF Assessment

A parent must also procure (obtain) all necessary products, environments, accommodation, goods and services to be provided for the child's safe consumption. Failure to do so is, again, an offence of child cruelty under s.1(2) of the act on the grounds of physical neglect and failing to prevent harm as impairment of health and development in Working Together to Safeguard Children (see, Part 2 B, 24, sentencing guidance, Overarching Principles: Overarching Principles: Assaults on children Assaults on children and Cruelty to a child; and Introduction, Working Together to Safeguard Children (HMG 2015) the governmental child protection guidance).

The procurement process for integrated provision is called a Children and Family Assessment, CAF Assessment, for integrated provision. The outcome is a CAF Action Plan to safeguard and promote the child's welfare with the specified outcomes of the services that best serve the child's needs to be delivered under the terms of proper consent (see 1.35 of Working Together).

In the Family Justice System the CAF Assessment is conducted by the Children and Family Court Advisory and Supervisory Service (CAFCASS) to safeguard and promote the welfare of children involved in family court proceedings. In the Youth Justice System and Special Education Needs the CAF Assessment is conducted by local council parental responsibility units following Schedule 2 of the Special Educational Needs Regulations (Consolidated) 2001.

The best interests of the child

Decision making

Decisions made on all the necessary products: environments, accommodation, goods and services procured to be provided for the child's safe consumption must be in the best interests of the child. A child is a person, not an object of concern who simply lacks the capacity to give consent on their own behalf until Gillick Competent to do so. They must still be involved in the decision-making processes for the products that best serve their needs in accordance with the best interests determination of s.4 Mental Capacity Act 2005. Failure of the responsible person to so is an offence on the grounds of emotional neglect (see, Part 2 B, 24, sentencing guidance, Overarching Principles: Overarching Principles: Assaults on children Assaults on children and Cruelty to a child; and Introduction, Working Together to Safeguard Children (HMG 2015) the governmental child protection guidance).

The welfare checklist

Working Together to Safeguard Children extends mental capacity to parental capacity for a person with parental responsibility and the best interests consideration under s.1(3)(a)-(f) the, so-called, [welfare checklist of family law Children Act 1989 Children Act 1989]. This is the UK implementation of Article 3 UN Convention on the Rights of the Child Best Interests of the Child.

s.1(3)(a) the wishes and feelings of the child in light of his age and experience; are the child's involvement in the decision-making process (see also s.17(4A) and s.47(4A) Children Act 1989).

s.1(3)(b) the child's physical, emotional and educational needs; are for physical and emotional neglect to be prevented and to receive a proper education (s.36 Children Act 1989) in accordance with his/her aptitudes, abilities and any special needs he may have (s.7 Education Act 1996).

s.1(3)(c) the likely effect of the change of circumstances are the likely outcomes for the child of the products as environment, accommodation, goods and services procured to be provided for him/her.

s.1(3)(d) the age, sex, background, and other relevant characteristics of the child specifies the child's current condition for which the provision is required to address.

s.1(3)(e) harm the child has suffered, or is at risk of suffering; specifies the harm, as ill-treatment or impairment of health and development the child has suffered or the hazards in his/her circumstances from which she is at risk of suffering harm. Just as in employment health and safety, these are the risks of the present care environment.

s.1(3)(f) capability of the parents, or anybody else considered relevant, of meeting the child's needs; is the ability and responsibility of the parents for procuring the necessary products as environments, accommodation, goods and services to promote the child's welfare to be safely provided to him/her in safeguarding his/her welfare.

Decision making and legal disability
There is both a business and social imperative to give all the opportunity for safely and satisfactorily consuming the offerings of producers. Some, may not have the capacity to be capable of giving proper consent or agreement for the products that best serve their needs to use those products safely. In the case of parents, their children's needs to keep their children safe. This is called Legal Disability.

Disability is the difference between capacity and capability. In the case of parents parental capacity of Working Together and parental capability of s.1(3)(f) of the Children Act 1989. Disability is defined as a mental or physical impairment with and adverse effect on normal day-to-day activities. A person without the use of their legs lacks the physical capacity to walk. They are not capable of carrying out the normal day-to-day activity of, say, shopping without some corrective measure such as a mobility scooter (see s.6 Equality Act 2010 and Guidance on Matters to be Taken into Account when Assessing Disability).

Mental capacity is the ability to make decisions in a best interests determination on a particular issue so as to be mentally capable of giving proper consent or agreement. Determining mental capacity requires the information on which the decision to be made to safeguard the person's welfare. A lack of mental capacity to process the information and make decisions is a legal disability leaving the person incapable of instructing a solicitor (s.3 Mental Capacity Act 2006, 26 Explanatory Notes to the Mental Capacity Act (2005); 1.6 Family Law Protocol (Law Society 2010)).

Physical, moral and emotional health, the mental faculties of decision making
Physical and moral health refer to the faculties of the mind used in making decisions. Physical health is the mental capacity to understand the effects of matter and energy on both self and others. That is, to understand how a person may be physically harmed which is called causality in the law of negligence. Moral health is the mental capacity to recognise the persons and environment that may be damaged by the acts and omissions in the law of negligence, the neighbour principle.

Part 1 of the Children and Young Peoples Act 1933 is headed "Prevention of Cruelty to Children and Exposure to Physical and Moral Danger". The offence of child cruelty under s.1(1) includes "...exposure in a manner likely to cause an unnecessary injury to health.". Again, the manner of the exposure endangers the child's physical and moral health as faculties of the mind. It means nothing more than setting a bad example in either behaviour towards others (moral health) or carelessness with potentially dangerous items, e.g. speeding in a motor car.

Emotional health is firstly intellectual health, the capacity to reason based on the understandings of physical and moral health when making decisions so as not harm a neighbour or neighbourhood. It is secondly the competencies to engage in social relationships, personal or business, under the terms of proper consent or agreement following that reasoning and decision making. Thirdly, it is the likely capability of applying those competencies to take opportunities in the cause of growth and well-being and then to perform reliably.

Child development and parental responsibility
The Department of Health Introduction to the Children Act 1989 described new notion of parental responsibility as "the authorities conferred by parental responsibility exist only for raising the child to physical, emotional and moral health". Lord McKay of the Clasfern, the Lord Chancellor when introducing the act to Parliament said "...the overwhelming task of parenthood and the all the rights it brings are for raising the child to be a properly developed adult, both physically and morally.".

The child's physical and moral health are developed as physical development and behavioural (moral) development of physical and moral capacities; the child's emotional health is developed as intellectual development for the capacity to reason based on those understandings when making decisions; social development as the competencies to enter into social relationships, both personal and business; and emotional development of likely capability to take opportunities in the cause of growth and well-being and perform reliably (see s.17(11) Children Act 1989).

"A child is a person not an object of concern"
Lady Elizabeth Butler Sloss made this oft quoted remark in her inquiry into the Cleveland child abuse scandal. As a medical discipline, child welfare under s.1 and s.44 of the Children and Young Peoples Act 1933 is only distinguished from animal welfare under s.9 Animal Welfare Act 2006 by consideration of the child's wishes and feelings when making decisions in her best interests following s.4 Mental Capacity Act 2005 extended to parental capacity by Working Together to Safeguard Children and s.1(3)(a)-(f) of the Children Act 1989.

An animal is a possession whilst a child is a person and this distinction was a central intention of the Children Act 1989. Lord McKay also said when introducing the act, "The days when a child was regarded as a possession of his family, indeed to sue on their loss, are today buried forever". The child is socially and emotionally developed, whilst he lacks capacity, by full involvement in the decision making process in his best interests until he becomes competent as Gillick Competent.

Disability, parental disability and social inclusion
The Department of Work and Pensions disability assessment is a measure of physical and mental capacities under clinical or controlled conditions from occupational health in respect to employment performance. The test for disability is capability as "the mental or physical impairment with an adverse effect on day-to-day activities" as social performance. The assessment of capacity is used in a home based disability assessment under s.47 NHS and Community Care Act 1990.

For a parent, a parental disability is the mental or physical impairment with the adverse effect on the day-to-day activity of giving the child the care it would be reasonable to expect a parent to give a similar child (s.31 Children Act 1989).

Whatever their mental or physical impairments parents should be given the necessary disability support to care for their children to maintain a reasonable standard of health and development. (s.17(10) Children Act 1989).

For those with parental responsibility mental capacity to make decisions in own best interests is extended to parental capacity to make decisions in the best interests of the child by Working Together to Safeguard Children. The s.47 disability assessment is extended by Part III and s.8 Part 1 Schedule 2 Children Act 1989.

Part III Children Act 1989 includes s.17 and the local authority duty to safeguard and promote the welfare of children by the provision of services for the families of children in need. The services include advocacy services for advice and assistance in decision making when exercising the authorities of parental responsibility. This was another clear intention of the act described in the Department of Health Introduction as "the belief that children are best brought up in the family with both parents playing a full part. the local authority duty to provide support for children and families."

The MARAC Process and risk assessment
The s.47 disability assessment is to support mental health care in the community and is conducted with a view to a possible deprivation of liberty for those who lack the capability to care for themselves in the community under Schedule A1 Mental Capacity Act 2005. The decision is made after a Multi Agency Risk Assessment Conference known as MARAC.

In the case a parent who is not capable of meeting the child's needs then the local authority can intervene with a court order under s.31(2) Children Act 1989. To do so they must meet the public law thresholds that the child is suffering, or likely to suffer, significant harm attributable to the care it would be reasonable to expect a parent to give, the same criteria as for parental disability support.

State intervention
It is assumed that the parent has been given the necessary support for any parental disability under the terms of proper consent, that the welfare of the child has been safeguarded and the risk to the child is parental negligence. The test of parental negligence is, following Donoghue later called the Bolam Test, the same test as for professional negligence. If a care order is made the local authority acquires parental responsibility under s.33 of the act as the, so-called, corporate parent.

These thresholds are highly controversial and poorly understood. A number of esoteric legal principles are involved and most easily understood in terms of employment performance and health and safety.

A parent, just like the CEO of a corporate body, must be, and be seen to be a fit and responsible person. If called into question the court will firstly examine the facts. In employment health and safety there are the facts of accidents, the accident record book of harm suffered, and the facts of the employment environment, harm likely to be suffered, say, from a trip hazard.

The facts are found to the civil standard of proof, the balance of probabilities, 'Did the facts of the alleged trip hazard occur?", this is called 'The Trier of Fact'. If so, do these found facts amount to a trip hazard?, this is called the Question of Law. This conforms that the alleged events occurred and were unlawful but that is not enough there is next the issue of culpability or State of Mind. Negligence is a state of mind. This notion comes from the criminal law and the offence of child cruelty under s.1 Children and Young Peoples Act 1933. What was the motivation, carelessness or malice? There is a defence of diminished responsibility, the offence occurred but was not voluntary or reasonably foreseeable by an impaired or incapacitated defendant.

The offence of child cruelty allows a defence of parental incapacity on a wide range of grounds (see sentencing guidance, Overarching Principles: Overarching Principles: Assaults on children Assaults on children and Cruelty to a child).

The employment health and safety approach is again helpful in understanding this complexity. To summarise so far, as a matter of fact found on the balance of probabilities, the child has suffered harm or been exposed to an unsafe environment. The person responsible for the child was in, at least, a negligent state of mind in failing to protect the child to safeguarding or promote his/her welfare. This is all based in the present and the final finding is as a fit and proper person to hold this responsibility into the future. Is there a track record of such irresponsible behaviour?

Preventing child neglect and abuse

The offence of child cruelty can be prosecuted concurrently with any assault on the child. If a child is assaulted, sexually or physically, then both the assailant and the person responsible for keeping the child safe from the assault are culpable for the harm suffered as physical abuse or sexual abuse. This completes the definitions of child neglect and abuse in Annex A of Working Together (see also Preventing child maltreatment: a guide to taking action and generating evidence (WHO 2006)).

The offence of child cruelty is the UK implementation of Article 19(1) UN Convention on the Rights of the Child Protection of Children From Violence. Article 19(2) requires social programmes to for preventing violence to children and these are to be found under s.4 Part 1 Schedule 2 Children Act 1989 and include services to children and families under Part III of the same enactment in meeting the local authority duty to safeguard and promote the welfare of children.

Child protection assessment 
A key part of child protection work is assessment.

A particular challenge arises where child protection professionals are assessing families where neglect is occurring. Professionals conducting assessments of families where neglect is taking place are said to sometimes make the following errors:
 Failure to ask the right types of question, including
 Whether neglect is occurring?
 Why neglect is occurring?
 What the situation is like for the child?
 Whether improvement in the family are likely to be sustained?
 What needs to be done to ensure the long-term safety of the child?

See also

Prominent child protection organizations
Odisha State Child Protection Society
Free the Children
Friends-International
Mannerheim League for Child Welfare
Save the Children
War Child
World Vision
UNICEF

Topics
 Aboriginal child protection
 Adoption and Safe Families Act
 Child abuse
 Child Protection and Obscenity Enforcement Act
 Child Protective Services
 Child sexual abuse
 Complex post traumatic stress disorder
 For the children (politics)
 Independent Safeguarding Authority
 Landeros v. Flood
 Reactive attachment disorder
 School social work in Hungary
 Transnational child protection

References

External links

 Resist.ca (History of Child Protection in America by Kirsten Anderberg, Graduate History Student, 2009)
 Childwelfare.org
 A Report Card on Child Protection. (PDF-File, 991 KB) — United Nations Children's Fund: Progress for Children, Number 8. September 2009.
 From 'left-behind' children to street children  (English)
 Sexual abuse casts shadow over left-behind children 
 BIIR Article 11(4) Awareness Campaign 
 African Child Policy Forum

Further reading
Fieldston, Sara. Raising the World: Child Welfare in the American Century (Harvard University Press, 2015)  316 pp. 
 McCutcheon, James, 2010."Historical Analysis and Contemporary Assessment of Foster Care in Texas: Perceptions of Social Workers in a Private, Non-Profit Foster Care Agency". Applied Research Projects. Texas State University Paper 332. TXstate.edu
 Handbook: Child protection UNICEF, IPU, 2004
 Eileen Munro.2008. Effective Child Protection. Publisher-SAGE , 9781412946957. 
 Jeff Fowler. 2003. A Practitioner's Tool for Child Protection and the Assessment of Parents. Publisher Jessica Kingsley Publishers. , 9781843100508
 Eileen Munro. 2007. Child Protection: Sage Course Companions Series. Publisher- SAGE. , 9781412911795
 Harries et al. 2008. Reforming Child Protection. Publisher- Taylor & Francis. , 9780415429054
 Janet Polnay. 2001. Child Protection in Primary Care. Publisher-Radcliffe Publishing. , 9781857752243
 Chris Beckett. 2007. Child Protection: An Introduction. Publisher-SAGE. , 9781412920926
 Gerald Cradock. Risk, Morality, and Child Protection: Risk Calculation as Guides to Practice. Science, Technology, & Human Values, Vol. 29, No. 3, Special Issue: Reconstructing Order through Rhetorics of Risk (Summer, 2004), pp. 314–331
 Leigh A. Faulconer. In the Best Interests of Children? Family Relations, Vol. 43, No. 3 (Jul., 1994), pp. 261–263
 Eileen Munro. Common errors of reasoning in child protection work

Protection
Social programs
Social work
Children's rights